Jacobsen Head is an ice-covered headland forming the northeastly point of Slichter Foreland, Martin Peninsula, on the Walgreen Coast of Marie Byrd Land, Antarctica. It was first delineated by the United States Geological Survey from air photos taken by U.S. Navy Operation Highjump in January 1947, and was named by the Advisory Committee on Antarctic Names after Commander Glen Jacobsen, U.S. Navy, captain of the icebreaker  on the 1954–55 reconnaissance cruise to Antarctica to examine sites for use as science stations during the 1957–58 International Geophysical Year.

References

Headlands of Marie Byrd Land